Stephen Reaves (born December 5, 1984) is a former professional Canadian football quarterback. He was signed by the Toronto Argonauts of the Canadian Football League as a street free agent in 2009 but was released at the end of training camp. He was re-signed to the practice roster on June 27, 2009. He played college football for the Southern Miss Golden Eagles and the Michigan State Spartans.

On February 22, 2010, Reaves was released by the Argonauts.

References

External links
 Toronto Argonauts bio

1984 births
Living people
Players of Canadian football from Tampa, Florida
American players of Canadian football
Canadian football quarterbacks
Southern Miss Golden Eagles football players
Toronto Argonauts players
Michigan State Spartans football players